, better known as , is a Japanese singer, actress, and entertainer represented by Horipro, and later Shochiku Geino.

Career
Chiemi Hori debuted in 1982, when she was only 14 years old. She steadily gained popularity and was tipped to be one of the most recognised idols in 1984 after producing a string of top 5 hits and starring in a few well-received dramas. In the same year, she was selected to perform in the NHK Red and White Song Festival - a prestigious annual year end programme. However, an exhausted Hori eventually got burnt out, forcing her to quit show business in 1987, at the age of only 20.

Hori returned in late 1989, but could no longer match her earlier success. From mid 1990s, she began to host TV programmes catered to housewives, and did some acting.

Hori is mother to five biological children from her first two marriages, in addition to being the stepmother of the two children of her current husband.

In February 2019, Hori announced that she has stage 4 tongue cancer and tumors on the lymph nodes on the left side of her neck. She underwent surgery to have the tumors and half of her tongue removed.

Filmography

TV series
Regular appearances

Other appearances

Dramas

Former TV appearances

Films

References

External links
 
 

1967 births
20th-century Japanese actresses
20th-century Japanese women singers
20th-century Japanese singers
21st-century Japanese actresses
21st-century Japanese women singers
21st-century Japanese singers
Japanese women pop singers
Japanese idols
Japanese television personalities
Living people
People from Sakai, Osaka